There are many examples of spits around the world. Some of which include:

By sea

Azov Sea

Russia
 Achuevsk Spit
 Beglitsk Spit
 Chushka Spit
 Dolgaya Spit
 Glafirovsk Spit
 Kamyshevatsk Spit
 Petrushino Spit
 Sazalniksk Spit
 Yasensk Spit
 Yeysk Spit

Ukraine
 Belosaraysk Spit
 Berdyansk Spit
 Fedotova Spit
 Krivaya Spit
 Obytichna Spit

 Crimea (disputed between Russia and Ukraine)
 Arabat Spit
 Tuzla Spit

Baltic Sea
 Curonian Spit, Russia/Lithuania
 Hel Spit, Poland
 Priwall, Germany
 Vistula Spit, Poland/Russia

Skagerrak
 Grenen, Denmark

By country

Australia
Lefevre Peninsula, Adelaide, South Australia
Letitia Spit, Fingal Head, New South Wales
Southport Spit, Gold Coast, Queensland
Tobias Spit, 1 km northeast of High Island, Frankland Islands, Queensland

Brunei 

Seri Kenangan Beach, Pekan Tutong, Tutong
Pelumpong Spit, Serasa, Brunei-Muara
Serasa Beach, Serasa, Brunei-Muara

Canada
Toronto Islands (former spit, now detached), Toronto, Ontario
Leslie Street Spit, man-made spit created as part of new harbour project
Long Point, Ontario
Point Pelee, Ontario on Lake Erie
Rondeau Provincial Park - a crescentric sand spit on Lake Erie
Blackie Spit (east section of the Crescent Beach), South Surrey, British Columbia 
 Sidney Spit, Sidney Island, British Columbia
 La Dune de Bouctouche, Bouctouche, New Brunswick
 Whiffen Spit, Sooke, British Columbia
 West Pen Island, Nunavut

China

Hong Kong
Central ferry pier
Discovery bay
Pui O, Lantau
Stanley
Tsim Sha Tsui before infilling

Croatia

 Zlatni Rat, on island Brač

Denmark 

 Grenen, the tip of the Jutland peninsula

Ireland
Inch Strand, Dingle Peninsula, County Kerry.
Donabate Beach, Donabate, County Dublin.
Portrane Beach, Portrane, County Dublin.

Jamaica
Palisadoes, Kingston, Jamaica

New Zealand
Aramoana, Otago
Farewell Spit, South Island

Pakistan
Sandspit

Russia 
 Russkaya Koshka, Chukotka

Singapore
Changi Beach
Tanjong Rhu

Spain 
 Cadiz, Andalusia
 La Manga, Mar Menor, Region of Murcia

United Kingdom

Wales
Conwy Morfa, Conwy
Fairbourne Spit, Fairbourne, Gwynedd

England
Blakeney Point, Norfolk
Calshot Spit, Hampshire
Chesil Beach, Dorset
Dawlish Warren, Devon
Hengistbury Head, Dorset
Hurst Spit, Hampshire
Mudeford Spit, Dorset
Orford Ness, Suffolk
Spurn Head, Yorkshire
Westward Ho! Pebbleridge, Devon

United States
Bodie Island and the Currituck Banks, on both sides of the border between Virginia and North Carolina, the northernmost of the Outer Banks
Clatsop Spit, Oregon
Deveaux Bank, South Carolina
Dungeness Spit, Sequim, Washington, the longest natural sand spit in the United States.
Ediz Hook, Port Angeles, Washington
Fenwick Island, on both sides of the border of Delaware and Maryland
Homer Spit, Homer, Alaska
Kotzebue, Alaska
Long Point, Provincetown, Massachusetts, at the tip of Cape Cod
Minnesota Point, Duluth, Minnesota Also referred to by locals as "Park Point", it's also said to be the world's largest freshwater natural spit.
Presque Isle, Erie, Pennsylvania
Provincetown Spit, Massachusetts
Sandy Hook, New Jersey
The Spit, Scituate, Massachusetts
Willoughby Spit, Norfolk, Virginia

References

Spits